Slazengers F.C. was an English football club based in Horbury, West Yorkshire.

History
The club played in the Yorkshire Football League Division 3 in 1964.

References

Defunct football clubs in England
Yorkshire Football League
Defunct football clubs in West Yorkshire
Works association football teams in England